Gliese 22, also catalogued V547 Cassiopeiae or ADS 440, is a hierarchical star system approximately 33 light-years away in the constellation of Cassiopeia.  The system consists of pair of red dwarf stars, Gliese 22A and Gliese 22C, orbited by a third red dwarf Gliese 22B in an outer orbit of about 223 years.

Planetary system 
As of 2008, it was announced that a possible extrasolar planet, Gliese 22B b, orbits Gliese 22B but this is currently unconfirmed. The study in 2011 has indicated the orbit of the purported planet is stable.

References

External links 
 
 

Binary stars
Brown dwarfs
Cassiopeia (constellation)
BD+66 0034
Flare stars
0022
002552
M-type main-sequence stars
Cassiopeiae, V547
Hypothetical planetary systems
TIC objects